Bar Rescue is an American reality television series that airs on Paramount Network (formerly Spike during the first five seasons). It stars Jon Taffer, a long-time food and beverage industry consultant specializing in nightclubs, bars and pubs. Taffer offers his professional expertise, renovations and equipment to desperately failing bars, in an effort to save them from closing.

The show premiered on what was then known as Spike in the United States on July 17, 2011. In the UK, the show originally aired on 5Star, later moving to Spike (UK).

A spin-off series titled Marriage Rescue premiered on June 2, 2019.

On September 22, 2020, it was announced that the series would move to another ViacomCBS network, as part of a since-rescinded plan to shift the Paramount Network to television films and miniseries. Bar Rescues move also never took place, as its eighth season premiered on Paramount Network on May 2, 2021. The eighth season focused on Taffer's residence of Las Vegas, a city whose hospitality industry was devastated during the COVID-19 pandemic, then returned with episodes of bars throughout the United States in its traditional format on March 20, 2022.

Overview 

The series stars Jon Taffer, owner and chairman of bar/nightclub consulting firm Taffer Dynamics, Inc. Taffer is a bar and nightclub owner who has started, flipped, or owned numerous establishments in a career that spans over three decades.  Bar owners submit an application via the Paramount Network website to have their failing establishment rescued by Taffer and his team of experts.

A typical episode begins with Taffer's team performing reconnaissance and surveillance on a struggling bar to determine its operational and service weaknesses. For the recon, one or more team members and/or local residents enter the bar, order food and drinks to gauge their quality, and form an opinion of the atmosphere and service. The surveillance involves hidden cameras, preinstalled with the owner's consent, through which Taffer and his team watch the kitchen and customer service areas. He then introduces himself to the owner(s) and staff to discuss his findings, and to describe the changes he believes should be made (management, customer service, cleanliness, etc.) in order to make the bar profitable. He also examines the bar's financial records to find possible cost savings. During these meetings, Taffer exhibits a brusque, no-nonsense, and confrontational attitude intended to goad the owner(s) and staff into making drastic changes to the way the bar is run – including the firing of inept and/or dishonest employees when necessary.

Taffer's team members train the staff on methods of improving food/drink preparation, customer service, and efficiency, frequently concentrating on a more limited selection of recipes than the bar typically offers. After the initial training, Taffer puts the bar through a "stress test" (similar to a soft launch), inviting in a large crowd of patrons in order to determine how well the staff can use their newly learned skills to deal with the pressure of a busy night. He uses market research, technological tools, and partner companies to scientifically measure the bar's performance. After discussing the stress test's results with owners and staff, Taffer meets with his experts to begin devising a new concept for the bar.

The experts put the staff through a second, more extensive phase of training, overhauling the menu to fit the new concept. Once this phase is complete, Taffer closes the bar for a few days so that construction crews can redesign the interior. Deep-cleaning and structural work are performed when necessary. After the overhauled bar (often re-branded with a completely new name or a variation of the old one) is unveiled, Taffer takes the owners and staff on a tour to point out its new features. During the grand re-opening, he observes the overall improvement as a large crowd again packs the bar.

An epilogue segment describes the changes in the bar's success or failure since the re-opening, through a combination of text and interviews with the owners and staff. Bars are not required to keep the changes that Taffer implements, and some have reverted to their original names, concepts, and/or menus since being featured on the show.

The bars featured on the show are already in dire financial and operational situations by the time Taffer intervenes, posing a significant challenge to a turnaround. Despite this, data shows that over half the bars featured, 92 of the first 166 featured through the midway point of season 6, have remained open, with the remaining 74 unable to overcome their challenges. Of the bars featured, Taffer has left four without remodeling (O Face Bar, an intended re-rescue of Second Chance Sports Bar, Black Light District Rock and Roll Lounge, and Hideaway Bar & Grill) and one without a grand re-opening (The Dugout).

Episodes

Production 
The series is from The Biggest Loser producers J.D. Roth and Todd A. Nelson for 3 Ball Productions/Eyeworks US. Spike announced picking up 10 episodes of Bar Rescue in January 2011. The show began shooting in April 2011. It was renewed on September 14, 2011 for a second season in the summer of 2012, from which the first episode of that season aired on July 29. Season 3 of the show premiered on February 10, 2013. On May 9, 2013, Spike TV renewed Bar Rescue for a fourth season of 20 more episodes.

On March 21, 2014, Spike TV ordered 20 more episodes of Bar Rescue. On June 27, Taffer announced on Facebook that he would begin shooting 30 episodes for season 4 after a week-long trip to Paris. The first half premiered on October 5, 2014 while the second half premiered on February 8, 2015. On May 30, 2015, Taffer announced on Facebook that he finished shooting season 4. It was announced that the remaining episodes for season 4 would air beginning Sunday, June 21, 2015.

In May 2015, Taffer announced season 5, with at least 20 episodes, on his Facebook page, with an update from Spike, issued in July 2016, that they had increased the fifth season to a total of 30 episodes. A sixth season was announced with a March 11, 2018 start date.

On May 2, 2019, the series was renewed for a seventh season with 12 episodes. The seventh season's roll-out from March 2020 until June 2020 was a victim of unfortunate timing, starting at the first height of the COVID-19 pandemic in the United States. Due to stay-at-home orders throughout the country and takeout food-only non-alcohol restrictions placed on the industry, the majority of the bars featured in the season were unable to take advantage of the post-episode publicity boost usually afforded the featured bars. It also effectively froze the show indefinitely from any future filming or planning for a presumptive eighth season, and the last half of the seventh season was fulfilled with a series of clip shows categorizing certain rescues into themes.

Eventually, the series went back into production for its eighth season with an all-Las Vegas season, due to the impact of the pandemic in Nevada on the region's hospitality industry. On February 9, 2022, Paramount Network announced that the second part of the eighth season would premiere on March 20. On July 10, 2022, Taffer confirmed on Twitter that the ninth and final season was in production.

Failed rescues 
The bars featured on the show are already in dire financial and operational situations by the time Taffer intervenes, posing a significant challenge to a turnaround. Nearly half the bars featured, 74 of the first 166 featured through the midway point of season 6, were unable to overcome their challenges resulting in the bar closure.

For example, the changes the show made to Downey's Irish Pub, featured in the July 24, 2011, episode "Downey's and Out", were not enough to prevent a planned sheriff's sale on August 2, 2011, due to $2.4 million owed to the city of Philadelphia and Wells Fargo bank, including $125,881 in business-privilege, wage, liquor and other taxes. Breakwall (from the season 1 episode, "Beach Bummer") closed in January 2012. Season 1's Swanky Bubbles, after reverting to its original title, has also closed its doors. The show's first rescued bar of season 2, Piratz Tavern, reverted to its original pirate theme and would later close in April 2015 (see below). The Chicken Bone, Canyon Inn, Angry Ham's Garage, Weber's Place, The Brixton, ZanZbar Stand Up Scottsdale!, and KC's reverted to their original names. The Chicken Bone brought back its previously popular menu, while Angry Ham's replaced unpopular items with previously popular items from its original menu. Season 2's J.A. Murphy's was sold by the owners shortly after the makeover, becoming a Mexican restaurant. Stand Up Scottsdale reverted to its original name due to problems with becoming a franchise of the Laugh Factory.

Rocket Room 6 in Austin, Texas, reverted to its old name, The Brixton, 6 weeks after its relaunch. The owner initially continued his use of social media to insult critics who were documented in the show, although the bar was not closed. He has since toned down his mood.

The Rocky Point Cantina in Tempe, Arizona, closed after a repaint of the bar triggered a code inspection, which uncovered years of modifications to the building that had been completed without building permits. The bar owner opted to close the bar rather than bring his building up to code.

Piratz Tavern 
The pirate-themed Piratz Tavern in Silver Spring, Maryland, which had been rebranded Corporate Bar and Grill by Taffer, reversed all of the changes Taffer made to the bar shortly after their episode was filmed. The owner released a YouTube video called "Piratz Revenge", showing the "Corporate" sign created by Taffer's team being shot at and burned in effigy. The video was heavily disliked by YouTube viewers, and garnered a positive rating of only 4%. Taffer said of their decision, "If you had a pirate concept that had failed for five years and had a new concept, would you go back to the concept that failed for five years or try something new? It defies logic that someone would go back to a (failed) concept just because they don't like the new name." The owners blamed the "negative publicity" on the show. Piratz was revisited as part of the April 5, 2015 episode, in which Taffer grades the bar an "epic fail", and the owner sought a second rescue. Within a week of the revisited episode's premiere, however, Piratz decided to close its doors for good. In a "Back to the Bar" episode, the owners made amends with Taffer and announce that they plan to open a new bar, Bar Refuge, within the next year in Florida. They also appeared alongside their daughter in the episode "Getting Freaky at the Tiki" as recon spies for The Tiki Lounge.

LABrewCo failure 
Taffer's most expensive rescue also resulted in his biggest failure. His visit to The Los Angeles Brewing Company during season 4 saw him put $1 million into updating the bar, which included the installation of a self-service beer tap and an in-house brewing system, which was intended to allow the bar, which was rebranded as LABrewCo, to start serving its own beer. Four months after the rescue, the brewing system was discovered to have never been used, the self-serve tap was disconnected, and the owner had reverted changes to the bar taps and the menu. In addition, LABrewCo's liquor license had been suspended and the business was put up for sale.

Legal issues

Lawsuit 
Jon and Nicole Taffer, along with the show's production company Bongo LLC, have been sued by Dr. Paul T. Wilkes from Bar 702 (formerly Sand Dollar). In the episode "Don't Mess with Taffer's Wife", Wilkes is shown to hit on Nicole, and Jon yells at him in retaliation. However, Wilkes stated that the producers ordered him to be sleazy and make offensive comments on women, and texted him to "Hit on Mrs. Taffer hardcore!!" After Wilkes did so, Wilkes states that Taffer called the control room to tell them to have a drink near the spot where he intended to confront Wilkes, so he could throw it in his face, and said to a colleague, "Now I'm going to show you why my show is Number One." According to Wilkes, Taffer came in to confront him and showed him footage of his audition tapes, in which he insulted the way Taffer dressed. Taffer then physically assaulted Wilkes, leading to a scuffle, resulting in a hyperventilating Taffer collapsing onto the floor. Wilkes stated that he suffered from emotional distress and symptoms such as migraines, nausea, vomiting, night terrors, crying spells, severe depression and anxiety attacks as a result of the confrontation. As of August 11, 2017, the case was dismissed with prejudice at the request of Dr. Wilkes after it settled in arbitration for a confidential amount. As a result, the "Don't Mess with Taffer's Wife" episode no longer airs in reruns on Paramount Network or appears on the network's website and apps and also does not appear on ViacomCBS' subscription video streaming service Paramount+.

Nashville rescue and Wayne Mills murder 
During the taping for season 3, Taffer visited BoondoxXx BBQ & Juke Joint in Nashville, Tennessee and worked with owner Chris Ferrell, who was noted for having a hot temper. The rescued bar was renamed Pit & Barrel and the episode featuring the bar was to air on November 24, 2013, but on the night before the episode was supposed to air, Ferrell was arrested by Nashville police for shooting and killing country singer Wayne Mills during an argument inside the remodeled Pit & Barrel. Spike immediately pulled the episode from its originally scheduled premiere slot in primetime. However, it failed to remove the episode replay carried three hours later at 1 a.m. ET/10 p.m. PT from its broadcast automation system, thus it still aired. The network drew criticism for the error, in light of the circumstances. Since the accidental airing, the episode has never re-aired, though it has been distributed on file-sharing websites.

Ferrell stood trial for the murder of Mills and asserted he acted in self-defense, claiming that Mills had violated the bar's nonsmoking rule and had threatened to kill him with a broken beer bottle. The jury convicted Ferrell of second-degree murder in March 2015 after a long-delayed trial, and he was given a 20-year sentence without the possibility of parole. The verdict and sentence were appealed, but were upheld by the appeals court in 2019.

After Ferrell's arrest, Pit & Barrel was closed by authorities. The city attempted to sell the bar, but nobody wanted to buy it due to its reputation, and the land in the booming area was more valuable than the business itself. In July 2016, the former bar was demolished and the land paved over to serve as a parking lot for nearby businesses.

International broadcast 
In the UK, the show airs on 5*, starting from January 8, 2014. It has since moved to the British Spike Channel since Viacom acquired Channel 5 UK. It's also aired in The Netherlands on Spike.

In Sweden, Bar Rescue is shown daily on TV12 and TV4 Fakta XL.

In Italy, the show is called Bar da incubo (Nightmare Bar). It is shown daily on Cielo TV and Italy Spike Channel.

References

External links 
 Bar Rescue at Paramount Network
 
 Bar Rescue Updates

 
2010s American reality television series
2020s American reality television series
Drinking culture
Food reality television series
2011 American television series debuts
2010s American cooking television series
2020s American cooking television series
English-language television shows
Television shows set in the United States
Paramount Network original programming